The 2005 mayoral election in Allentown, Pennsylvania was held on November 8, 2005, and resulted in the Democrat Ed Pawlowski, being elected to his first of four terms over Republican challenger and former mayor, William L Heydt.

Background

In the previous election, Democrat Roy Afflerbach was elected mayor, however, during his tenure he had difficulty working with the city council. Often being engaged in inflammatory remarks and being blamed by the council for all the city's woes, including the falling through of a possible minor legaue baseball team, the Ottawa Lynx, relocating to Allentown. Due to the hostility directed towards him, and the stress of having to run the city, Afflerbach chose to note seek re-election opening the door to a fresh slate of Democratic candidates.

Campaign

Both the Republican and Democratic primaries where hotly contested during this election. On the Democrat side you had Ed Pawlowski Afflerbach's Director of Community and Economic Development and the former director of Lehigh Housing Development Corporation. Siobhan "Sam" Bennett, former first vice chair of the Lehigh County Democratic Party and former CEO of both the Women's Campaign Fund and She Should Run as well as a candidate for congress who ran on a tough on crime platform. She would raise the most money out of any candidate, Republican or Democrat at $96,000. And Louis Belletieri, owner of an Italian restaurant who served on the commission that wrote Allentown’s home rule charter. On the Republican side you had former mayor William L Heydt face off against city councilmen David K Bausch with the main point of contention between the two being either candidates personality and ability to win the general election with Bausch presenting himself as cool and level headed while Heydt was fiery and quick to anger. Heydt would go on to secure the nomination for the Republicans, while Bennett suffered a major upset at the hands of Pawlowski who secured the Democratic nomination. 

The campaigning for the general election was particularly charged in 2005. Heydt positioned himself as a moderate fiscal conservative and charged Pawlowski with mismanaging city funds during the Afflerbach administration pointing out the evaporation of the $7,900,000 budget surplus he left behind in 2001 and further decried the lowering of the city's bond rating to BBB+. Pawlowski on the other hand ran a campaign based on optimism for what he can do to improve the city should he take office. Discussing how he can restore pride in the city and end the city's decay, although he offered little specifics. Another contentious issue would be Heydt's refusal to recognize Martin Luther King Jr. Day during his time as mayor, and Pawlowski vowed Affirmative action in the hiring of his cabinet if he was elected to better reflect the city's growing diversity. Additionally, local landlord Michael Molovinsky would run an independent campaign and was able to attend the mayoral debates where he proposed eliminating government funding for programs that help low-income families find housing in order to cover the municipal budget shortfall. For this he would have accusations of Racism brought against him by the local chapter of the NAACP which he denied.

Pawlowski's campaign of optimism and restoration of the city's former glory resonated more with the voters of Allentown allowing him to defeat Heydt in a margin of 58.67%-37.82%, with Molovinsky receiving 3.49%. To date the Republicans have not been able to again reach Heydt's 6,539 votes, with the most competitive election since coming in 2017 when Pawlowski ran despite having a 54-count Indictment against him for multiple counts of conspiracy, bribery, attempted extortion, false statements to federal officials, mail fraud, and wire fraud. Even then the Republicans where only able to get 4,440 votes or 36.74% of the electorate (compared to Pawlowski's 4,758 votes or 39.37% of the electorate).

Results

See also
 2005 United States elections
 Mayors of Allentown, Pennsylvania

References

Allentown
 2005
Allentown